College of Medicine & Sagore Dutta Hospital (CMSDH), also known as Sagar Dutta Medical College, is a tertiary referral government hospital, medical college and research institute in the state of West Bengal, India. It is situated at Kamarhati, in the suburbs of Kolkata. It has been set up by the Government of West Bengal in 2010 and started M.B.B.S. courses from 2011 to reduce the shortfall of doctors in the state. It is affiliated to the West Bengal University of Health Sciences and recognised by Medical Council of India.

History

Sagore Dutt Charitable Hospital and Dispensary initially started as a philanthropic organization with an objective of all round health care of the poor peasants and industrial workers of Kamarhati and adjoining areas. Its immense service to fulfill the objectives was recognized when the Medical Secretary, Dr. Anderson, on his India tour, visited ‘a rural hospital and dispensary situated outside Calcutta, the Sagore Dutt Charitable Hospital and Dispensary’ in January, 1937. The institute was taken over by the Government of West Bengal when it passed the Sagore Dutt Hospital Act, 1958.

Considering the dearth of medical professionals in West Bengal with the Doctor:Population ratio of 1:2600,  Government of West Bengal decided to start a new medical college with a capacity of 100 MBBS student, in a strategic location of Kamarhati, which is the gateway of North Kolkata. In 2010, the Government of West Bengal issued a memo in which a sanction was accorded to set up a medical college, with an intake of 100 MBBS students, in the campus of the Sagore Dutt Hospital. 

After the inspection by M.C.I. team in 2011, Letter of Permission was received by the Authority of College of Medicine & Sagore Dutta Hospital on 30/06/2011 . Classes for the first year M.B.B.S. course commenced on 1 August 2011. The college has received recognition for all M.B.B.S. degrees granted on or after February, 2016.

The DMLT and DRD courses started in the Academic Year 2014-15. The DPT, DOPT, DOTT and ECG courses started from 2015. The DCCT course was started from 2016.

The Post Graduate courses started in 2019, thus becoming the first college in West Bengal established after 2005 to provide Post Graduate courses.

Campus

Location

Located near Kamarhati bus terminus on B.T. Road, the College of Medicine and Sagore Dutta Hospital is adjacent to the Kamarhati E.S.I. Hospital. Kamarhati is a city and a municipality under Belghoria police station  of Barrackpore subdivision in North 24 Parganas district in the Indian state of West Bengal. It is a part of the area covered by Kolkata Metropolitan Development Authority. Kamarhati is located at 22.67°N 88.37°E, a part of the urban agglomeration of the metropolis of Kolkata. The sacred temple of Dakshineshwar is situated in Kamarhati Municipal area. Towns like Belgharia and Ariadaha are part of Kamarhati.

The nearest airport (Netaji Subhas Chandra Bose International Airport) is located 12 km away and the nearest railway station (Agarpara railway station) is located 2.2 km away.

Infrastructure

 The total campus area is 17.63 acres.
 The eight-storey academic building houses the central library, lecture theatres, demonstration rooms and practical laboratories along with the auditorium and the morgue.
 The six-storey  hospital buildings has 500 beds and 11 O.T.s.
 The buildings have been constructed at a cost of Rs. 100 crore with modern facilities and emergency safety features.
 The old hospital building has been renovated and has become the new OPD building. OPD timings are from 10 A.M. to 2 P.M.
 The Central Library in the new academic building houses a 7500 books along with 80 foreign journals and has high-speed internet facility for e-library facility.
 Hospital Blood Bank and Fair price medicine shop is present.
 Separate hostels for boys and girls with option for availing cable broadband internet.
 Separate Hostel for Interns.
 The three canteens serve both veg and non-veg foods of various types.
 Residential quarters for teachers and staffs.
 A Rs. 40 crore tertiary cancer care centre is under construction, the first of its kind in a state-run medical college of West Bengal.
 Nursing college with attached hostel.

The campus area is owned by the Health Department of Government of West Bengal. It includes the following:
 3 water ponds
 New OPD Building
 New Academic Building
 New Hospital buildings
 Students Hostel Block
 Interns Hostel
Nursing college
 Residential Quarters

Academics

Academic programmes 
Under Graduate:
 MBBS (4.5 years course + 1 year Compulsory Rotatory Internship)

Post Graduate:
 M.D. Pharmacology
 M.D. Biochemistry
 M.D. Community Medicine
 M.S. Ophthalmology
 M.D. Anaesthesiology
 M.S. Obstetrics and Gynaecology
 M.D. Pediatrics
 M.D. Psychiatry
 M.D. Chest Medicine

Diploma:
 DCCT - Diploma in Critical Care Technology
 DMLT (Tech) - Diploma in Medical Lab Technology
 DRD (Tech) - Diploma in Radiology
 DOPT - Diploma in Optometry with Ophthalmic Technique
 DOTT - Diploma in Operation Theatre Technology

Admission 
Admission to the MBBS course was undertaken by W.B.M.C.C.. Earlier, admission was according to the rank list of the West Bengal Joint Entrance Examination (WBJEE) and All India Pre Medical Test (AIPMT), the latter accounting for 15% of the seats. The admission of the 2013 batch and all batches from 2017 onwards is now based on the National Eligibility cum Entrance Test (Undergraduate) (NEET-UG) rank list.

Admission to Diploma courses is undertaken by S.M.F.W.B. according to marks obtained in Physics, Chemistry and Biology.

Admission to the Post Graduate courses are based on NEET-PG rank list.

Departments

The following departments are present in the medical college:
    Department of Anesthesiology
    Department of Anatomy
    Department of Biochemistry
    Department of Chest Medicine
    Department of Community Medicine
    Department of Dermatology
    Department of Dental Surgery
    Department of E.N.T.
    Department of Forensic Medicine
    Department of General Medicine
    Department of General Surgery
    Department of Gynecology & Obstetrics
    Department of Microbiology
    Department of Ophthalmology
    Department of Orthopedics
    Department of Pathology
    Department of Pediatric Medicine
    Department of Pharmacology
    Department of Physical Medicine
    Department of Physiology
    Department of Psychiatry
    Department of Radiodiagnosis
    Department of Radiotherapy

Student life
Asterica - The annual college fest, spanning six days including the Pre Fest Events, consisting of various programmes and performances by noted artists.
Alfresco - Fresher's welcome programme to welcome the new batch of students.
Asydoc- Convocation programme of the MBBS passing batch
Pratyay - Annual Magazine
Ritam Mukherjee Smriti Cup - Intra-college Football League
Sagore Dutta Premier League - Intra-college Cricket League
Saraswati puja
Rabindra Jayanti
International Mother Language Day
Foundation Day
Teachers' Day
Teachers vs. Students Cricket Match

References

External links
 
 https://search.wdoms.org/home/SchoolDetail/F0003295

Medical colleges in West Bengal
Universities and colleges in North 24 Parganas district
Affiliates of West Bengal University of Health Sciences
Educational institutions established in 2010
2010 establishments in West Bengal